Greatest Hits: 18 Kids (known as Greatest Hits: 19 Kids on the reissue) is a greatest hits album by Keith Urban, released on 20 November 2007 by Capitol Nashville. It contains 16 of Urban's hits as well as two new songs. Two versions of the album were released: a regular edition and a special edition; the second disc includes 12 music videos. Both versions use the radio edits of Urban's songs, except for "Somebody Like You." Also included is a cover of Steve Forbert's 1980 single "Romeo's Tune" and a re-recording of the non-single "Got It Right This Time", from his 2006 album Love, Pain & the Whole Crazy Thing.

The album debuted at number 11 on the U.S. Billboard 200 chart, selling at least 117,000 copies in its first week. It received a Gold certification from both the RIAA and CRIA. It has sold 1,208,700 copies in the U.S. as of April 2017.

Re-issue
The album was re-released as Greatest Hits: 19 Kids on 19 August 2008 to include a newly recorded version of "You Look Good in My Shirt". This song was originally recorded on his 2002 album Golden Road, and the newly recorded version was issued as a single in June 2008.

Track listing

Personnel

Romeo's Tune
Tom Bukovac - electric guitar
Perry Coleman - background vocals
Jerry Flowers - background vocals
Dann Huff - acoustic guitar
Charlie Judge - keyboards
Chris McHugh - drums
Steve Nathan - piano, B-3 organ
Jimmie Lee Sloas - bass guitar
Keith Urban - lead vocals, background vocals, electric guitar, ganjo

Got It Right This Time (The Celebration)
Tom Bukovac - electric guitar
Jerry Flowers - background vocals
Dann Huff - electric guitar, background vocals
Charlie Judge - keyboards
Chris McHugh - drums
Steve Nathan - B-3 organ
Jimmie Lee Sloas - bass guitar
Keith Urban - Fender Rhodes, piano, electric guitar, slide guitar solo, lead vocals, background vocals

You Look Good in My Shirt
Dann Huff - electric guitar
Charlie Judge - keyboards
Chris McHugh - drums
Jimmie Lee Sloas - bass guitar
Russell Terrell - background vocals
Keith Urban - electric guitar, lead vocals, background vocals

Chart performance

Weekly charts

Year-end charts

Singles

Certifications

References

2007 greatest hits albums
Keith Urban albums
2007 video albums
Music video compilation albums
Capitol Records compilation albums
Capitol Records video albums